Mark Barry may refer to:

 Mark Barry (musician), member of English pop group BBMak
 Mark Barry (cyclist) (born 1964), British cyclist